Wang Chau is an island of Hong Kong. Administratively, it is part of Sai Kung District.

Conservation
Together with Basalt Island and Bluff Island, it forms the Ung Kong Group and is part of Hong Kong Global Geopark.

The Ung Kong Group Special Area covers 176.8 hectares and was designated in 2011. It consists of Basalt Island, Bluff Island, Wang Chau, their surrounding islets, and Kam Chung Ngam in the southern part of Jin Island. The geology of the area is characterised by volcanic rocks of the Cretaceous periods.

References

External links

 Stunning tubular rock columns and sea caves － Wang Chau

Uninhabited islands of Hong Kong
Sai Kung District
Hong Kong UNESCO Global Geopark
Islands of Hong Kong